The Morane-Saulnier MS.250 was a crew-trainer aircraft built by Morane-Saulnier in the late 1920s.

Design
The MS.250 was a parasol-wing monoplane with swept-back wings, similar to the Morane-Saulnier MS.230, but differed in having a new tail. The cockpits had windscreens, and the rear cockpit had a gun ring. The pilot-instructor manned the front cockpit, and the trainee observer manned the rear cockpit. A second aircraft was built with a more powerful engine as the MS.251.

Variants
MS.250 Initial design prototype, powered by a   Salmson 9Ab radial engine; one built.
MS.251 A second aircraft, powered by a  Lorraine 7Mc radial engine.

Specifications (MS.250)

References

Further reading

1920s French military trainer aircraft
Morane-Saulnier aircraft
Aerobatic aircraft
Parasol-wing aircraft
Single-engined tractor aircraft
Aircraft first flown in 1929